Williams Field at Carter Memorial Stadium is a baseball venue on the campus of Radford University in Radford, Virginia, United States.  It is home to the Radford Highlanders of the NCAA Division I Big South Conference.  The field opened in 1986 and underwent extensive renovations in 2011.  Its capacity is 800 spectators, with a grass area down the left field line allowing for overflow crowds.

Other uses of the stadium include baseball camps and high school baseball tournaments.

History 
The facility opened in 1986.  In July 2007, Joe Raccuia assumed control of the program with plans for facility upgrades.

Renovations beginning in 2008 led to reconstruction of the field.  In 2008, a new backstop was installed.  Dugouts were enlarged and the playing surface improved in 2009.

In 2011, the venue's name was changed from Radford Baseball Field to Radford Baseball Stadium, due to major renovations.  Branch and Associates, Inc. led a project to rebuild the stadium.  A seating structure with 800 chair-backed seats was added, in addition to a new concourse, press box, and PA system.  New stadium lighting allowed night games to be played.  The construction project, which cost $800,000, was the first in Radford athletics history to use only private funding.

Construction was completed during the 2011 season.  The new stadium was officially opened for the program's first-ever home night game, a sold-out crowd on April 8, 2011 against VMI. Radford set its attendance record just days later when an over-capacity crowd of 1,373 witnessed the top ranked Virginia Cavaliers play the Highlanders.

The venue changed names to Williams Field at Carter Memorial Stadium in 2017.

See also
 List of NCAA Division I baseball venues

References

External links 
April 8, 2011, Stadium Opener Photo Gallery at RU Highlanders

College baseball venues in the United States
Baseball venues in Virginia
Radford Highlanders baseball
Buildings and structures in Radford, Virginia